1937 Pattern Web Equipment (also known as '37 Webbing') was an item of military load-carrying equipment. It replaced the 1908 Pattern and 1925 Pattern—on which it was based—and was standard issue for British and Commonwealth troops from its introduction in 1937, throughout World War II, and in the post-war period until it was superseded by 58 pattern webbing. It remained in limited use with second line troops until the mid to late 1980s.

Development
At the end of the First World War, huge stocks of 1908 Pattern equipment remained, and the difficult financial climate meant that these remained in service with the British Army in the post-war period. In 1932, the Chief of the Imperial General Staff established the Brathwaite Committee to look into the uniform and equipment of the infantry and to make recommendations for their improvement. The increasingly complex nature of combat and different roles that soldiers and members of the other services were being required to undertake, meant that the new design needed to be flexible, thus it was decided that it would consist of interchangeable components, which could be modified to suit the individual needs of a soldier based on his role. In 1932, the Mills Equipment Company, the prime manufacturer of the 1908 equipment, offered the Brathwaite Committee four new designs to consider. Although the committee decided on one of the designs in 1934, the ongoing trials to find a successor to the Lewis gun that resulted in the Bren gun, and also abortive trials of automatic rifles including the Pedersen rifle, meant that new webbing could not be adopted until decisions had been reached on future weaponry.

The design was confirmed on 8 June 1938 and wide-scale issue began in 1939. Towards the end of World War II, some 37 Webbing was produced in jungle green for troops fighting in the Pacific Theatre, although purpose-made 44 Pattern Webbing was then introduced for the humid jungle conditions, being lighter in weight, quicker drying and rot-proofed. Although 44 Pattern continued in use with the British Army for jungle warfare in its various post-World War II colonial conflicts, it did not replace 37 Pattern in general service, which was in front-line use up until the introduction of 58 Pattern. However, 37 Pattern was used for second line and support troops and was included in the army's Catalogue of Ordnance Stores and Ammunition (C.O.S.A.) in 1985, but had finally disappeared by the time of the 1991 edition.

Description

1937 Pattern Webbing was made from cotton webbing, which was waterproofed and dyed before being woven. The fittings were made of stamped brass—blackened steel post war—and it was produced by various manufacturers. It was produced in a khaki colour for the Army, which could then be dyed with Blanco, such as Pea Green (a light shade of  green) or KG3 (a darker, more olive green) for the army and blue-grey for the Royal Air Force. Military Police had white webbing.

Standard components included a belt (issued in sizes Normal and Large), cross straps (called 'braces'), cartridge pouches for .303 ammunition (which gave way to 'universal' pouches to carry ammunition for an array of infantry weapons then in use by the British Army, in addition to grenades), a carrier for the waterbottle and a small pack. The large (1908) pack—intended to be carried in regimental transport except when in full marching order—and entrenching tool carrier were retained from World War I issue, although the later was initially issued in modified form before being reintroduced in 1941. Frogs for the 1907 SMLE and No.4 Rifle bayonets were also issued. Different combinations of these components comprised the 'marching order' and the 'battle order' respectively. In addition various items were issued to be used by officers and often armoured crewmen, such as pouches for binoculars, pistol ammunition and compass (externally the same as that for pistol ammunition but with felt padding inside), as well as a 'valise' side pack and holster for the .38 revolver (a tank crew version with leg strap also existed in two versions).

A number of items were issued which conformed to 37 Pattern in their fittings and materials but were not strictly part of the set, such as a bandolier for Sten magazines as issued to airborne troops and the spare barrel bag and parts wallet for the Bren gun.

Components

Basic Components
Small Pack( Haversack): A rectangular pack that attached to the brace ends on the left hip. It was partitioned in the middle and the rear partition was split in two with two Mess Tins stored in one side containing washing and shaving kit, knife, fork and spoon and housewife (sewing kit). Spare shirt, pair of socks, pair of draws cellular and hand towel. The ground sheet/rain cape folded to cushion the back with part showing under the packs flap. It was worn on the back when the large pack was not worn.
Binoculars Case: A box that carried the Binoculars Pouch and binoculars. The back of the case attached to the web belt with two long oval metal hooks. The same case could also be used for carrying the iron sight for the tripod-mounted BREN gun; it came in a fitted wooden box to cushion and protect it.   
Compass Pouch: A square pouch that was the same size and shape as the pistol ammunition pouch except it was felt-lined to cushion the compass. It sat above the Binoculars Case attached to the right-side shoulder strap.
Water Bottle: The Mark VII water bottle was attached to the brace ends on the right hip in either a 'skeleton' or 'bucket' style webbing carrier.
Large Pack: A rectangular pack worn on the back with the Small Pack (haversack) carried on the left hip. The large pack contained the Great Coat, spare shirt, pair of socks and a pair of draws cellular.
Basic Pouches: Two pouches were carried on the belt (front), one held two Bren magazines, the other a singular spare Bren magazine and a bandolier. They were retained by the left and right shoulder straps.
FSMO (Full Service Marching Order): This included, Large Pack, Small Pack(left side), Bren Magazine Pouches and Water Bottle.
Battle Order: Small Pack, two Basic pouches, a bayonet frog (left side) and Water Bottle(right side).

Holsters
Pistol Case: A cross-draw belt holster worn on the left hip that was designed to carry the Enfield No 2 Revolver.
Pistol Case, Royal Tank Corps (1916–1939) / Royal Armoured Corps (1939–Present): A straight-draw thigh holster worn on the right thigh that was used by Tank commanders to carry the Enfield No 2 Revolver. It had a long strap that allowed it to extend to the upper leg and a tie-down strap on the holster to secure it. It had six cartridge loops on the side of the holster to hold spare ammunition and a cleaning rod pocket along the front edge. There are pictures showing Commandos wearing a cross-draw shoulder holster worn under the left armpit made from a converted version of this rig.
Pistol Case, Parachute Regiment: A thigh holster designed to carry the Colt 1911 ACP Automatic Pistol. Similar in design to the other pistol holsters other than being longer to allow for the longer barrel and for the end of the barrel section to be leather, rather than woven.

Ammunition carriers
The system could be used to flexibly mix and match components, but regulations usually had soldiers wear set combinations.  
Grenade Carrier: A horizontal rectangular case with two pouches. Each pouch could carry a No 36M Mills Bomb Fragmentation Grenade. The back of the carrier slid on the web belt with two long oval metal hooks. It was designed to be worn on the side of the belt on the hip rather than the front and therefore has no shoulder strap link.        
Basic Pouch: A large vertical rectangular pouch that went through three versions (Marks I, II, and III). It could carry either (2) BREN magazines, (6) 20-round Thompson SMG magazines, (4) No 36M Fragmentation, No 69 Offensive, or No.77 White Phosphorus grenades, (4) No 36M cup-discharger rifle grenades with attached gas-check baseplates, (2) Smoke Grenades, or boxes of Small Arms Ammunition. The Mark I version had three cartridge loops sewn into the inner lid for carrying three ballistite Rifle Grenade Blanks for launching rifle grenades; this feature was later omitted on the Mark II pouch. The longer Basic Pouch Mark III could hold (5) 32-round STEN Machine Carbine Magazines.      
Pistol Ammunition Pouch: A small pouch that carried a rectangular box of (12) rounds of .38/200 ammunition for the Enfield No 2 Revolver. It could be secured between the Pistol Case and the left brace.      
Cartridge Carrier: A horizontal rectangular case with two square pouches that carried a total of 20 rounds (4 × 5-round clips). It was designed for use by non-infantry soldiers who carried a rifle. Each pouch contained (2) 5-round chargers that were separated by a cloth divider. The pouch had two snaps: the bottom snap was used if only one clip was carried and the top snap was used if both clips were carried. The back of the carrier attached to the web belt with two long oval metal hooks and the top had a strap that linked into the shoulder strap.
Lanchester Magazine Pouch: This long rectangular pouch carried (3) 50-round magazines for the Lanchester Machine Carbine that was used by the Royal Marines, Royal Navy and RAF. The back of the carrier slid on the web belt with two long oval metal hooks and the top had a short strap that linked into the shoulder strap. It was so high that it went almost up to the wearer's chin.  
Vickers G.O. Gun Magazine Pouch, Alternate: This was an oval pouch designed to hold a drum for the Vickers K machine gun. It could hold a 100-round drum. The back of the carrier slid on the web belt with two long oval metal hooks and the top had a strap that linked into the shoulder strap.

Accessories
Bandolier: A rectangular piece of cloth with 5 pockets and a shoulder strap. Each pocket carried (2) 5-round Mauser-style stripper clips for a total of 50 rounds. It went through 3 marks and 4 versions during the war (Marks I, II, III, and III/1).   
Utility Pouch: A pair of large vertical rectangular pouches with a built-in cloth yoke and a narrow strap for securing across the chest. It was a bigger version of the Basic Pouch.  The yoke could be worn over the neck and the pouches across the chest or worn over the shoulder with the pouches across one side. Each pouch could carry either (3) BREN gun magazines, (2) Boys Anti-Tank Rifle magazines, (3) 2-inch O.S.B. mortar shells, a Mark VII water bottle, several grenades, or boxes of Small Arms Ammunition.

Notes

References

See also
39 Pattern Webbing

External links

 37 pattern webbing reference website

British Army equipment
Personal military carrying equipment
World War II military equipment of the United Kingdom
Military equipment introduced in the 1930s